Shin Hyun-ho (born September 21, 1953) is a Korean football midfielder who played for South Korea in the 1980 Asian Cup. He also played for Hanyang University, Chungui and POSCO FC

Club career
He played for  POSCO FC, Chungui and Hallelujah FC.

International career
He was part of the South Korea squad in the 1980 Asian Cup

References

External links

Association football midfielders
South Korean footballers
South Korea international footballers
Pohang Steelers players
K League 1 players
1953 births
Living people
Hanyang University alumni
1980 AFC Asian Cup players
Place of birth missing (living people)